STREAMS Integrated Intelligent Transport System is an enterprise traffic management system designed to operate in the Microsoft Windows environment.  Like most traffic management systems, STREAMS is an array of institutional, human, hardware, and software components designed to monitor, control, and manage traffic on streets and highways.  Advanced traffic management systems come under the banner of ITS (intelligent transport systems).  ITS is the application of information and communications technology to transport operations in order to "reduce operating costs", "improve safety" and "maximize the capacity of existing infrastructure".  STREAMS provides traffic signal management, incident management, motorway management, vehicle priority, traveler information, flood monitoring  and parking guidance within a single integrated system is what the product says.  STREAMS is developed by Transmax.

History 

In 1969, the Department of Main Roads (Queensland) installed the first Intelligent Transport System in Australia (located at Surfers Paradise).  This included 30 signalized intersections featuring centralized control and traffic responsive capabilities.

In 1985, a second-generation traffic management system was installed in Cairns, Australia.  This was known as the TRAC System, or Traffic Responsive Adaptive Control System.  Progressive installation of the TRAC system followed at several more sites around Queensland including the capital city, Brisbane.

In 1988, a traffic management system was installed for the South East Freeway in Brisbane, Australia.  The features included were ramp metering and graphical displays of traffic conditions. It also provided automatic incident detection.

In 1992, a new integrated intelligent transport system development was commenced. The objectives were to lower ongoing costs while providing increased performance and opportunity for future ITS applications. The resulting system was STREAMS.

In 2002, the division of Department of Main Roads (Queensland) responsible for continuing development of STREAMS was privatized to form Transmax. The company remains 100% owned by the Queensland Government Department of Transport and Main Roads.

In April 2007, Transmax in partnership with VicRoads implemented a coordinated ramp metering trial in Melbourne, Victoria on a 15 km section of the Monash Freeway.  Later that year, in December, VicRoads installed STREAMS to manage another six ramps.

These developments were part of a much larger M1 Upgrade Project that continued over the next three years, eventually winning the 2010 National ITS Australia Award.  The project to upgrade the 75-kilometre M1 Freeway, increased the capacity and safety of the Monash Freeway, the CityLink Tollway (Southern Link) and the West Gate Freeway utilising STREAMS as the Integrated Control System.

In 2016, Transmax partnered with Parsons Brinckerhoff to trial STREAMS motorway management functionality for the Utah Department of Transportation in the United States.

Software Architecture 

STREAMS employs a distributed computing software architecture.  Field hardware such as intersection controllers, video cameras and speed detectors are connected via field processors back to a central application server.  Users connect to the application server via the workstation software.  Field communications are via Optical Fibre, DSL, or Wireless connections.

The software is built in distinct modules for each distinct area of traffic / transport control and monitoring.  The workstation software communicates to the application server software via a publisher / subscriber model (i.e. workstations subscribe to specifically requested streams of data which are published by the application server).

The software architecture model is designed to support the software's claim of being an "integrated" Advanced Traffic Management System.  This breaks away from the inter-operability model, which is multiple ITS systems working in parallel, each performing a discrete function.

The workstation software is built around a central user interface called "STREAMS Explorer".  Other specification / reporting applications can all be launched from STREAMS Explorer.

The transport network data is set up via a GIS (Geographic Information System).  The GIS allows for a graphical user interface displaying transport network data overlaid on street maps and updating in real-time.

Adaptive Traffic Management 

STREAMS implements adaptive traffic management through a feature called "Dynamic Plan Selection". Depending on the density of traffic (occupancy) and the dominant direction of traffic (for example, inbound, outbound, or bidirectional) on a road, nearby signalized intersections are operated using several predefined traffic plans. A user sets up the signal timing and picks the traffic density levels and direction that they apply to. Selecting the appropriate signal timing is then automatic. When a time-based traffic plan schedule would be inappropriate because of varying traffic levels, STREAMS Dynamic Plan Selection can adapt to unexpected traffic levels as they arise.

With help from the academic community, STREAMS Smart Motorways offers the coordinated ramp-metering algorithm suite ALINEA/HERO. The modular architecture of STREAMS allows Transmax to integrate new algorithms as they become available. STREAMS applies the computed metering rates using ramp signal controllers deployed at the roadside. Controlling multiple consecutive ramps, ideally the whole motorway, makes it possible to maintain a more consistent motorway flow and prevent flow breakdown. Using HERO, STREAMS is able to balance queues across multiple ramps and maximize motorway performance.

See also 

 Traffic Management System
 Intelligent Transport Systems
 SCATS
 BLISS
 Geographic Information System
 ITS Australia

References

Further reading 
 "Award for EVP Technology" ITS International, August 2013
 "Melbourne installs smart road technology" ITS Australia, July 2013 
 "2013 iAwards Winners" ICT, June 2013 
 "Emergency responders get the green light at awards" Queensland Government Department of Transport and Main Roads, June 2013
 "APICTA 2011 Winner" Asia Pacific ICT Alliance Awards, November 2011.
 "Queensland ICT companies scoop up international awards" Government Services, Building Industry and ICT, November 2011.
 "2011 National and State iAwards Winners" 2011 iAwards, August 2011.
 "TRL expands its Traffic Management Solution with STREAMS" TRL, May 2011.
 "Smart roads set to get smarter?" ZDNet, September 2010.
 "Reducing Congestion on the M1 Goes Hi-Tech" Victorian Department of Roads and Ports, November 2008.
 "New Technology to Cut Freeway Congestion" Transport Futures Institute, November 2008.
 "Green lights all the way for emergency vehicles during trial" Queensland Department of Transport and Main Roads, September 2008.
 "Traffic management nerve centre part of congestion-busting focus" Queensland Department of Transport and Main Roads, September 2008.
 "Synchronisation of Brisbane’s traffic lights part of efforts to cut congestion" Queensland Department of Transport and Main Roads, July 2008.
 "Record spending to maintain Queensland’s roads" Queensland Department of Transport and Main Roads, June 2008.
 "Congestion busters for Sunshine Coast" Queensland Department of Transport and Main Roads, July 2007.

External links 
 Transmax
 Department of Transport and Main Roads

Intelligent transportation systems